Navsari  is the ninth biggest city in the state of Gujarat in India. It is the administrative headquarters of Navsari District. Navsari is situated between Surat & Mumbai. Navsari is a twin city of Surat. It is located 37 km south of Surat. As per 2011 Census of India, Navsari is 16th biggest city of Gujarat state. It ranked 10th most populous city of Gujarat in 1991 Census of India and 2001 Census of India. Navsari is the 23rd "cleanest city of India" located in the west zone according to the Swachh Bharat Urban mission. Dandi village near Navsari was the focal point of the great Salt March led by Mahatma Gandhi during civil disobedience movement of India.

History 

Navsari was originally known as "Navasarika", and was the capital of a vishya (an administrative unit) in the Lata region. It is identified with "Nusaripa", a city mentioned in Ptolemy's 2nd century Greek-language work Geography.

The Chalukyas of Navasarika, who governed the area around Navsari as subordinates of the Chalukyas of Vatapi, repulsed an Umayyad invasion of the area in 738-739 CE.

According to the Parsi tradition, in 1142 A.D., when they first came to Navsari, the city was named Nag Mandal. The Parsis found the city's atmosphere similar to that of the Sari region of Iran. In the Persian language, "now" means new, and "Sari" refers to the region in Iran, hence the name Naoo Sari. Two families of Parsi Zoroastrian priests settled in Navsari in the early 13th century, and the town soon emerged as the main center of the Parsi priesthood and religious authority. As the Parsi community grew at other places in India, the priests from Navsari were sought by the new Parsi settlements throughout the country. It is the home of the Bhagarsath Atash Behram established in 1765, which is now a World Heritage Site. Surat replaced Navsari as the principal settlement of the Parsi community in the 18th century, following its rise as a major trade center for the European factories, and the Maratha incursions into Surat; Surat itself lost this position to Bombay in the later years.

Geography
It has an average elevation of 9m (29') above sea level. The city is located in southern Gujarat and is situated near the Purna River, within a few kilometers of the river's delta, which is west of the city and empties into the Gulf of Khambhat. The weather in Navsari is sunny from October to May, and rainy from June to September. The average maximum and minimum temperatures are 42 °C (107.6 °F) and 17 °C (62.6 °F) respectively. The average annual rainfall is 122 cm (48 in).

Demographics 

The city's first settlers were the Chalukyas, followed by the Rashtrakutas, and subsequent settlements by the Parsis.

According to the 2011 census, Navsari had a population of 171,109. Males constituted 52% of the population and females 48%. Navsari had an average literacy rate of 88%, higher than the national average of 74%: male literacy was 92%, and female literacy was 84%. 10% of the population was under 6 years of age.

Gujarati is the main language spoken in Navsari. The other languages spoken are Hindi & English.

Landmarks
The Sayaji Vaibhav Public Library Navsari is an important public building in Navsari.

The Meherjirana library.

This is one of the oldest libraries in the South Gujarat Region. It was established by the first Dastur (Parsi/Zoroastrian priest) Meherji Rana, who was also born in Navsari. He was invited by Akbar in a religious program organized by the Great Akbar. Leaders of all religious groups participated in it. Akbar asked to start a conversation and eventually asked to give information about their religion. All the religious leaders gave information about their religions and gradually tried to show their religions as great except Dastur Meherjirana. Afterward, the leaders asked Akbar his opinion as to whose religion is great. Akbar was really impressed by Dastur Meherjirana, so he asked him. Meherjirana Dastur calmly replied, "All religions are equal in terms of strength and ideology and principle". Akbar was extremely impressed by his personality. He donated a piece of land to Dastur Meherjirana in Navsari, where today The Meherjirana Library stands. Akbar wrote on a scroll about the donation of land which is still preserved by the management of the library.

Dandi

The Dandi seashore is an important location from the point of view of India's Independence Movement. In 1930 Mahatma Gandhi started the "Dandi March" from Sabarmati Ashram up to the Dandi seashore to protest against a tax on salt by the colonial government.

Ajmalgadh

Though it is surrounded by high hills, this is a historical place. Zoroastrians/Parsis roamed in the forest and cave of Ajmalgadh to save and protect their sacred fire-cauldron for nearly 250–350 years. Recently, the local administration constructed a pillar on the hill of Ajmalgadh describing the story. They also closed the cave which was used to protect the holy fire.

Transportation
The nearest domestic and international airport is  Surat International Airport at Magdalla, Surat, 27 km. There are other two airports nearby, Vadodara Airport, 178 km north from the Navsari city & Chhatrapati Shivaji Maharaj International Airport, 239 km south-west from Navsari city.

 also lies on the Mumbai-Delhi railway link, one of the busiest railway routes in India.

Navsari is well connected by NH 64 also known as Sabarmati-Dandi Highway. NH 48 also passes through the city. Navsari is only 30 km south of Surat.

Education

Universities and colleges

Engineering Universities and colleges 
 Mahatma Gandhi Inst. of Technical Education and Research
 GIDC Degree Engineering College

Arts & Commerce Universities and colleges 

 Sorabji Burjorji Garda Arts College
B.P. Baria Science College
 Navsari Agricultural University
 P.K. Patel Commerce College
 Navsari Law College
 Vallabhbudhi Polytechnic, Navsari
 Naranlala College of Professional and Applied Science
 S.S. Agrawal College of Arts and Commerce, Navsari
 S.S. Agrawal College of Nursing Training College and Research Centre, Navsari
 S.S. Agrawal Institute of Management and Technology, Navsari
 S.S. Agrawal Homeyopathic Collage, Navsari
 B.D. Gohil, Navsari.
 Dinshaw Daboo Law College
 District Institute of Education and Training, Navsari - B. Ed. College
— Famous Academy
 Gyansetu Institute for All Competitive Exams- Near Harbhole, Kanyashala no 1

Schools 
 Podar International School, Navsari
 Sheth H.C. Parekh, Navsari High School
 Hamara school
Tapovan SanskarDham Vidhyalaya
 Bai Navajbai Tata Zoroastrian Girls School
The Vidyakunj High School
 Seth P.H. Vidyalaya (Sanskarbharti)
 Akhil Hind Mahila Parishad High School
 Bai Navajbai Tata Girls' High School
Sir C.J. Navsari Zarthosti Madresa High School
Seth R.J.J. High School
 Sir Jamshetji Jeejeebhoy English medium high school
The Simlak Muslim Education Institute, Simlak, Jalapore
 The Navsari High School
 Real English School
St. Francis of Assisi Convent High School
 Bhakta Ashram
 Seventh-Day Adventist English School
 Dadabhau Kawasji Tata High School
 Dinbai Daboo Girls High School
 Late G.C Patel Vidhyalaya
 R.D Patel Sarvajanik High School
 Mamta Mandir
 Seth Banatwala High School
 Shree Sardar Patel Vidhya Bhavan, Jalalpore
 Shree Sardar Sharda Mandir, Vijalpore
 Hemali English Primary & Modern English Secondary & Higher Secondary School
 Naranlala Higher Secondary School
 Divine Public School
 Sri Sathya Sai Vidyaniketan, Ganeshvad Sisodra
 Seventh Day English School, Shyam Nagar, Navsari
 Sanskar bharti ,Navsari

Hospitals 
 The Dorabji Nanabhoy Mehta Sarvajanik Hospital
 K.D.N. Gohil Hospital
 Daboo Hospital
 Rotary Eye Institute
 Orange Hospital
 Yashfin Hospital
 Mulla Hospital
 Civil Hospital
 Kejal Hospital
 Dhruvini Nursing Home & Iccu
 MAA cancer Hospital
 Nirali cancer research hospital
 Ramaben Hospital
 Lions Hospital
 Shraddha Hospital 
 Shushrusha Hospital
 Anand Hospital
 Parmar Hospital
 Unity Hospital
 Surbhi Hospital
 Maroliya hospital for women

Notable people

 Dadabhai Naoroji, known as the "Grand Old Man of India", Member of Parliament (MP) in the House of Commons of the United Kingdom between 1892 and 1895
 Jeetan Patel (1980), New - Zealand international Cricketer of Indian Origin.
 Homai Vyarawalla (1913–2012), first woman photojournalist of India, Padma Vibushan
 Ram Ganesh Gadkari (1885 - 1919), Marathi poet, playwright, and humorist
 Jamsetjee Jejeebhoy, merchant and philanthropist
 Meherji Rana, spiritual leader of the Parsi community in India
 Jamsetji Tata, founder of what would later become the Tata Group of companies, regarded as the "father of Indian industry"
 Kurush Deboo, Indian film actor, famous for Munnabhai M.B.B.S. was born in Navsari
 Ketan Mehta, Indian film director who has also directed documentaries and television serials
 Hiralal Jairam, cricketer

References

External links
Official website of the Navsari Nagarpalika.
Official website of the Navsari Collectorate (in Gujarati).

Cities and towns in Navsari district
Zoroastrianism in India
Parsi culture
Parsi people